Senator Menard may refer to:

Joan Menard (born 1935), Massachusetts State Senate
Linda Menard (born 1943), Alaska State Senate